Pulaski County Courthouse is a historic courthouse located at Waynesville, Pulaski County, Missouri.  It was designed by architect Henry H. Hohenschild and built in 1903.  It is a two-story, Romanesque Revival style, red brick building on a limestone foundation.  It has Italianate style detailing including rounded arched openings.

It was listed on the National Register of Historic Places in 1979.

References

County courthouses in Missouri
Courthouses on the National Register of Historic Places in Missouri
Romanesque Revival architecture in Missouri
Italianate architecture in Missouri
Government buildings completed in 1903
Buildings and structures in Pulaski County, Missouri
National Register of Historic Places in Pulaski County, Missouri